The 2017 Six Nations Championship was the 18th series of the Six Nations Championship, the annual northern hemisphere rugby union championship. The tournament was also known as the RBS 6 Nations because of the tournament's sponsorship by The Royal Bank of Scotland Group.

It was contested by defending champions England, France, Ireland, Italy, Scotland and Wales. Including the competition's previous iterations as the Home Nations Championship and Five Nations Championship, it was the 123rd edition of the tournament.

For the first time the 2017 tournament used the bonus point system common to most other professional rugby union tournaments. As well as the standard four points for a win and two for a draw, a team scoring four tries in a match received an additional league table point, as did a team losing by seven or fewer points. Additionally, to ensure that a team winning all of its five matches (a Grand Slam) would also win the Championship, three bonus points were to be awarded for this achievement.
 
For the second successive year, the championship was won by England with a round to spare.
However, they were denied the Grand Slam and Triple Crown in the final game by a defeat to Ireland in the final round, the fifth time this has happened to England in the Six Nations era (2000, 2001, 2011, 2013 and 2017) and the third time at the hands of the Irish (the other two being 2001 and 2011).

Participants

1 Except the round 2 match against Italy, when Best was a late withdrawal due to illness and Jamie Heaslip took over the captaincy.
2 Replaced original captain Greig Laidlaw, who was ruled out of the Championship after sustaining an injury during Scotland's game against France in round 2.

Squads

Table

Fixtures

Round 1

Notes:
 Scotland reclaimed the Centenary Quaich for the first time since  2013, the last time they beat Ireland.
 Scotland won their opening Six Nations match for the first time since  2006.
 Ireland lost their opening Six Nations match for the first time since  2012.
 Stuart Hogg became Scotland's highest try scorer in the Six Nations.
 Ireland received the first bonus point in the history of the Six Nations.

Notes:
 Arthur Iturria (France) made his international debut.
 England won their 15th consecutive match, their longest winning run.

Round 2

Notes:
 Niall Scannell (Ireland) made his test debut.
 Ireland captain Rory Best was named to start but was withdrawn from the team due to illness on the day of the match.
 CJ Stander became the first forward to score a hat-trick in the Six Nations.
 Ireland earned the first try bonus point in the history of the Six Nations.
 This was Ireland's largest victory in the tournament.

Notes:
 George North was named to start for Wales but was replaced by Alex Cuthbert after failing to recover from injury.

Notes:
 Stuart Hogg (Scotland) earned his 50th test cap.
 Simon Berghan (Scotland) made his international debut.

Round 3

Notes:
 Scotland ended a record nine-match losing streak against Wales by winning for the first time since their 21–9 victory in 2007.
 With this victory, Scotland climbed from seventh to fifth in the World Rugby Rankings, their highest position since the rankings were introduced in 2003, overtaking South Africa and Wales.

Notes:
 Henry Chavancy (France) made his international debut.

Notes:
 Leonardo Ghiraldini was named in Italy's starting XV, but was ruled out before kick-off due to injury.
 Owen Farrell (England) earned his 50th cap.
 Michele Campagnaro scored Italy's 900th try in tests.
Italy made the unorthodox tactical decision not to commit any players to rucks after tacking an English ball carrier. Under the laws at the time, this meant that no offside line formed and the Italians were free to position themselves among the English formation, threatening interceptions. In reaction, the rules regarding rucks were changed later that year.

Round 4

Notes:
 Justin Tipuric (Wales) earned his 50th test cap.

Notes:
 Luca Sperandio (Italy) and Antoine Dupont and Fabien Sanconnie (both France) made their international debuts.
 Guilhem Guirado (France) earned his 50th test cap.
 France retained the Giuseppe Garibaldi Trophy.
 France's win also guaranteed Italy would win the "wooden spoon" for coming last.

Notes:
 Joe Marler (England) earned his 50th test cap.
 Cornell du Preez (Scotland) made his international debut.
 For a second consecutive season, England claimed the Six Nations title prior to the final round.
 The 61 points scored by England is the most scored against Scotland, and the 40-point margin equalled their previous largest winning margin set in  2001 (43–3).
 This was also the most points Scotland had scored against England at Twickenham since  2005, when they scored 22 points, and the second largest number of points they had ever scored in a game away to England overall. 
 England matched New Zealand's  International record of 18 consecutive wins set between August 2015 and October 2016.
 England won their 11th consecutive Six Nations match, a  championship record.
 England retained the Calcutta Cup.

Round 5

Notes:
 Federico Ruzza (Italy) made his international debut.
 This was Vern Cotter's last game as head coach.
 This was the first time Scotland has kept Italy scoreless.
 This was the first time, since beating Canada 41–0 in  2008, that Scotland kept their opponent scoreless.
 This was Scotland's first match in the Six Nations where they kept their opponent scoreless.
 The match concluded Scotland's most successful Six Nations tournament since they won 3 games in 2006.

Notes:
 Ken Owens (Wales) earned his 50th test cap.
 This was France's first win over Wales since their 9–8 victory during the 2011 Rugby World Cup.
 France finished in the top half of the table for the first time since  2011 and Wales finished in the bottom half for the first time since that same year, with fifth their lowest position since  2007.
 The winning points were scored in the 100th minute of the match in one of the longest games on record.

Notes:
 Jamie Heaslip withdrew from the team after suffering an injury during the pre-match warm-up. He never recovered from the injury or played again and retired in February 2018.
 Andrew Conway (Ireland) made his international debut.
 Tom Wood (England) earned his 50th test cap.
 This was Eddie Jones's first loss as England coach, and England's first since losing 33–13 to Australia in the 2015 Rugby World Cup.
 Ireland reclaimed the Millennium Trophy.
 This was the second time in six months that Ireland had beaten a team with 18 straight wins, having also ended New Zealand's winning streak in  November 2016.

Statistics
A record eight players were joint top try scorers, with Ireland flanker CJ Stander the first forward in the Six Nations era to score a hat-trick in a single match, against Italy. Stander's compatriot Craig Gilroy's own hat-trick in the same game set a new record – a replacement scoring three tries despite playing only 33 minutes in the entire tournament.

Top points scorers

Top try scorers

See also
 2017 Women's Six Nations Championship

References

External links
Official site

 
2017 rugby union tournaments for national teams
2017
2016–17 in European rugby union
2016–17 in Irish rugby union
2016–17 in English rugby union
2016–17 in Welsh rugby union
2016–17 in Scottish rugby union
2016–17 in French rugby union
2016–17 in Italian rugby union
February 2017 sports events in Europe
March 2017 sports events in Europe
Royal Bank of Scotland